Castell-Castell was a county in the Holy Roman Empire, ruled by a branch of the Counts of Castell. It was established as a partition of Castell-Remlingen in 1668, and it was partitioned between itself and Castell in 1709. It annexed the County of Castell in 1772, and was mediatised to Bavaria in 1806.

Counts of Castell-Castell (1668–1806)
Wolfgang Theodoric (1668–1709)
Augustus Francis Frederick (1709–1767) reigned mutually with
Charles Frederick Gottlieb (Count of Castell-Remlingen) (1709–1717) and
Wolfgang George II (1709–1736) and
Christian Frederick Charles (Count of Castell-Rüdenhausen (1736–1773)
Albert Frederick Charles (1773–1806) mutually with
Christian Frederick (later Count of Castell-Rüdenhausen) (1773–1803)

(Mediatized) Counts of Castell-Castell 
 Friedrich Ludwig (1810-1875)
 Carl (1875-1886)
 Friedrich Carl (1886-1901)

(Mediatized) Princes of Castell-Castell 

 Friedrich Carl, Count 1886–1901, 1st Prince 1901-1923 (1864-1923), wed 1895 Countess Gertrud of Stolberg-Wernigerode
  Carl, 2nd Prince 1923-1945 (1897-1945), wed Princess Anna-Agnes of Solms-Hohensolms-Lich
  Albrecht, 3rd Prince 1945-2016 (1925-2016), m. Marie Luise, princess of Waldeck and Pyrmont
  Ferdinand, 4th Prince 2016–present (born 1965), wed Countess Marie-Gabrielle von Degenfeld-Schonburg
 Carl, Hereditary Count of Castell-Castell (born 2001)
  Count Johannes (b.2011)

References 

1668 establishments in the Holy Roman Empire
Counties of the Holy Roman Empire